John Franks may refer to:

 John A. Franks, American businessman
John Franks (judge), Irish Indian judge

See also

Jack D. Franks, Illinois attorney and politician
John Frank (disambiguation)